Open era or Open Era may refer to:  

 Open Era, the period in tennis since 1968 where professionals can compete in Grand Slam tournaments
 Open era sometimes refers to Mikhail Gorbachev's period of glasnost  and perestroika in the Soviet Union

Open era or wide-open era, may also refer to:  
 Open range era of the American Old West when cattle were allowed to roam freely in many states
 Early 20th century in many U.S. communities when gambling, prostitution, and/or other vices were tolerated by local governments. Among these communities were:
 Galveston, Texas
 Hot Springs, Arkansas
 Atlantic City, New Jersey